Bledi Kasmi is the editor in chief of Rilindja Demokratike.

Information
Kasmi is also member of Tirana County and the Tirana Municipal Council.

References

Year of birth missing (living people)
Living people
Rilindja Demokratike
Newspaper editors
Albanian journalists
People from Tirana
Place of birth missing (living people)